Arcola is a town in Washington County, Mississippi.  The population was 361 at the 2010 census.

History
According to linguist Keith Baca, the name Arcola may be derived from the Choctaw language meaning "jar".

In the 1900s, Leroy Percy owned the Trail Lake Plantation, a Southern plantation near Arcola.

In his 2015 travel book entitled Deep South: Four Seasons on Back Roads, author Paul Theroux describes it as a "ghost town."

Geography

Demographics

2020 census

As of the 2020 United States Census, there were 304 people, 95 households, and 65 families residing in the town.

2000 census
As of the census of 2000, there were 563 people, 183 households, and 122 families residing in the town. The population density was 2,515.2 people per square mile (988.1/km2). There were 220 housing units at an average density of 982.9 per square mile (386.1/km2). The racial makeup of the town was 95.03% African American, 4.80% White and 0.18% from two or more races. Hispanic or Latino of any race were 0.18% of the population.

There were 183 households, out of which 36.6% had children under the age of 18 living with them, 23.0% were married couples living together, 36.1% had a female householder with no husband present, and 33.3% were non-families. 27.9% of all households were made up of individuals, and 13.7% had someone living alone who was 65 years of age or older. The average household size was 3.08 and the average family size was 3.83.

In the town, the population was spread out, with 36.6% under the age of 18, 10.3% from 18 to 24, 25.8% from 25 to 44, 18.5% from 45 to 64, and 8.9% who were 65 years of age or older. The median age was 28 years. For every 100 females, there were 77.6 males. For every 100 females age 18 and over, there were 71.6 males.

The median income for a household in the town was $18,409, and the median income for a family was $18,594. Males had a median income of $22,321 versus $13,466 for females. The per capita income for the town was $6,827. About 43.4% of families and 49.7% of the population were below the poverty line, including 63.2% of those under age 18 and 53.2% of those age 65 or over.

Education
The Town of Arcola is served by the Hollandale School District. It is also home to the Deer Creek Academy, an independent private school founded in the 1970s.

References

External links
 Mississippi Teacher Corps

Towns in Mississippi
Towns in Washington County, Mississippi
Mississippi placenames of Native American origin